Nyköping Municipality in Sweden held a municipal election on 15 September 2002.

Results
The number of seats remained at 61 with the Social Democrats winning the most at 29, an increase of four from 1998. The number of valid ballots cast were 30,844.

By constituency

Urban and rural votes

Percentage points

By votes

Constituencies

Nyköping Eastern

Nyköping Northern

Nyköping Western

References

Nyköping municipal elections
Nyköping